Illinois Route 97 (IL 97) is a north–south state highway in the central and western portions of the U.S. state of Illinois. It extends from I-55 Business (Business Loop I-55) in Springfield northwest to U.S. Highway 150 (US 150) near Galesburg. It crosses over the Illinois River on a bridge west of Havana.

Route description 

IL 97 starts off in Springfield on East Clear Lake Avenue. It heads west, forming a concurrency with IL 125. IL 97 splits off and north shortly after, entering Menard County.

In Menard County, along a concurrency with IL 123 in New Salem, it passes Lincoln's New Salem State Historic Site near Petersburg, the home of Abraham Lincoln in the 1830s. It afterwards passes through Mason County. The road enters Fulton County immediately after crossing a bridge concurrent with US 136 and IL 78.

It then passes both the Emiquon National Wildlife Refuge and Dickson Mounds State Memorial. Afterwards, it drops the concurrency with IL 78 and US 136 but picks up US 24. During and after it gains concurrency with IL 100, it heads north throughout hills. It enters Knox County after a brief concurrency with IL 9. It continues north through hills until its northern terminus at US 150 near Galesburg.

History
IL 97 is the site of a pioneering work of highway beautification, the planting in 1934 of what was once a line of 'red haw' hawthorns and other Illinois native trees along the tourist route from west of Springfield to New Salem.  The work, done by the Civilian Conservation Corps and the Illinois Federation of Garden Clubs, is commemorated by a marker installation at Tallula Junction, the southern intersection of Illinois Route 97 and Illinois Route 123.

Major junctions

References

External links

097
Transportation in Sangamon County, Illinois
Transportation in Menard County, Illinois
Transportation in Mason County, Illinois
Transportation in Fulton County, Illinois
Transportation in Knox County, Illinois